Tugay (Tuğay) is a rural locality (a selo) and the administrative centre of Tugaysky Selsoviet, Blagoveshchensky District, Bashkortostan, Russia. The population was 555 as of 2010. There are 9 streets.

Geography 
Tugay is located 26 km south of Blagoveshchensk (the district's administrative centre) by road. Yakshivanovo is the nearest rural locality.

References 

Rural localities in Blagoveshchensky District